Tours Football Club (commonly referred to as simply Tours) is a French association football club based in Tours, the capital city of the Indre-et-Loire department. The club play in Ligue 2, the second level of French football. Following is the description of its plays in 2012–13 season.

Squad 

As of 11 July 2012.

Competitions

Ligue 2

League table

Results summary

Results by round

Matches

Coupe de la Ligue

Coupe de France

References 

Tours FC
Tours FC seasons